Strathroy (Blue Yonder) Airport  is located  east of Strathroy-Caradoc, Ontario, Canada.

References

Registered aerodromes in Ontario
Transport in Strathroy-Caradoc